Coyecques  is a commune in the Pas-de-Calais department in the Hauts-de-France region of France.

Geography
A small farming village situated 10 miles (16 km) south of Saint-Omer, at the D157 and D158 crossroads, by the banks of the river Lys.

Population

Places of interest
 The church of St.Pierre, dating from the seventeenth century.
 A watermill.

See also
Communes of the Pas-de-Calais department

References

Communes of Pas-de-Calais